The 2006–07 Liga Bet season saw Beitar Ihud Mashhad (champions of the North A division), Ironi Sayid Umm al-Fahm (champions of the North B division), Maccabi Ironi Kfar Yona (champions of the South A division) and Maccabi Ironi Netivot (champions of the South B division) winning the title and promotion to Liga Alef.

The runners-up in each division entered a promotion/relegation play-offs with the clubs ranked 12th in Liga Alef. In the north section, Ironi Tiberias (from North B division) won the play-offs and was promoted. In the south section, Hapoel Tzafririm Holon from Liga Alef won over both runners-up and remained in Liga Alef. However, since Hapoel Maxim Lod folded over the summer, South A division runner-up, Beitar Kfar Saba was also promoted.

At the bottom, Hapoel Kisra, Hapoel Deir Hanna (from North A division), Hapoel Kiryat Ono, Hapoel Ihud Bnei Jaffa (from South A division), Maccabi Kiryat Ekron and Hapoel Bnei Lakhish (from South B division) were all automatically relegated to Liga Gimel. In North B division, Hapoel Tel Hanan and Maccabi Daliyat al-Karmel were both had their activity suspended during the season and were demoted to Liga Gimel.

North A Division

North B Division

During the season, Hapoel Tel Hanan and Maccabi Daliyat al-Karmel failed to show to fixtures and were punished with suspension of activity, their record was annulled and the clubs were demoted to Liga Gimel.

South A Division

South B Division

Promotion play-offs

North play-off
Liga Bet North A and North B runners-up, Ahva Arraba and Ironi Tiberias faced the 12th placed club in Liga Alef North, Hapoel Kafr Sumei. The teams played each other in a round-robin tournament, with all matches held at a neutral venue, Green Stadium.

Ironi Tiberias won the play-offs and was promoted to Liga Alef.

South play-off
Liga Bet South A and Liga Bet South B runners-up, Beitar Kfar Saba and Hapoel Masos/Segev Shalom faced the 12th placed club in Liga Alef South, Hapoel Tzafririm Holon. The teams played each other in a round-robin tournament, with all matches held at a neutral venue, Bat Yam Municipal Stadium.

Hapoel Tzafririm Holon won the play-offs to retain its place in Liga Alef. Since Hapoel Maxim Lod folded during the summer break, Beitar Kfar Saba was promoted as well, as they had better winning percentage of the two Liga Bet south divisions' runners-up.

References
 The Israel Football Association 
 The Israel Football Association 
 The Israel Football Association 
 The Israel Football Association 
Play-off Liga Alef/Liga Bet One 

Liga Bet seasons
5
Israel